The Committee for Health is a Northern Ireland Assembly committee established to advise, assist and scrutinise the work of the Department of Health and Minister for Health. The committee also plays a key role in the consultation, consideration and development of new legislation.

Until 2016, the committee was called the Committee for Health, Social Services and Public Safety.

2017–2022 Assembly 
The committee met for the first time in the 2017–2022 Assembly on 23 January 2020.

Changes 2017–2022

Source:

2016–2017 Assembly 
The committee met for the first time in the 2016–2017 Assembly on 2 June 2016.

Changes 2016–2017

2011–2016 Assembly 
The committee met for the first time in the 2011–2016 Assembly on 25 May 2011.

Changes 2011–2016

See also 
 Committee

References

External links 
 Committee for Health

Northern Ireland Assembly
Parliamentary committees on Healthcare